A list of windmills in the German state of Saxony.

Windmills
Saxony
Tourist attractions in Saxony